Chinta Koyya is a village in Y. Ramavaram Mandal, East Godavari district in the state of Andhra Pradesh in India.

Demographics
 India census, this Village had a population of 196: 101 male and 95 female. Population of children below 6 years of age was 18%. The literacy rate of the village is 33%.

References

Villages in Y. Ramavaram mandal